Ovidiu Petre (born 22 March 1982) is a Romanian former footballer who played as a defensive midfielder and currently he is a video analyst at FCSB. Considered a veritable talent in his early playing years, he had his career hindered by numerous knee injuries.

Club career

FC National (2000–03)
Petre began his professional career at FC National Bucharest during the 1999–00 season, making his first team debut in a 3–2 defeat to Rapid București on 22 April 2000. The first two seasons spent at FC National did not brought him many professional successes, making only ten appearances. In the 2001–02 season FC National were so close to winning the championship. Petre improved his performances and became an essential player for his team. In the European Cups, Petre played 6 matches for FC National in the UEFA Cup.

Galatasaray (2003–05)
In 2003, he was transferred to Galatasaray. The Turkish team paid 1 million € for the midfielder. He made his Süper Lig debut on 13 September 2003 in a 1–0 loss against Konyaspor. He played 4 matches with Galatasaray in the season 2003–04 in UEFA Champions League. After almost two seasons at Galatasaray, Petre did not confirm his skills and he was transferred at the middle of the 2004–05 season to FCU Politehnica Timişoara.

Poli Timișoara (2005–06)
After one season spent at FC Timişoara, the coach that properly launched Ovidiu Petre's career, Cosmin Olăroiu, left Poli and signed a contract with Steaua București. Petre proved he's not mature yet and he made public his intentions to cancel his contract with Poli in order to play for the new team of his favourite coach. After many negotiations Petre got his transfer to Steaua in the beginning of the 2006–07 season.

Steaua București (2006–10)
In August 2006, however, he signed a 5-year contract with Steaua București for a fee of €1,000,000, joining his former manager Cosmin Olăroiu once again. He made his debut for Steaua on 9 September 2006 in the victory against FC Argeş with 1–0. Petre scored his first goal for Steaua against his former team, Poli Timișoara, in a 3–1 win. In the 2007–08 season, he scored two consecutive goals, one with Pandurii Targu-Jiu in a 1–0 win and the other one in the derby with CFR Cluj, which Steaua won with 3–1. After that game the championship title was still a hope for Steaua, getting behind with 9 points of the leader, CFR Cluj. His first goal in the UEFA Champions League was against FC Sevilla, even though he scored Steaua lost the match with 1–2. In August 2008, Italian club AC Torino showed interest to the defensive midfielder. Steaua owner, Gigi Becali, has lowered the possible transfer fee down to €7,8 million. On 21 October 2008, he scored his second Champions League goal against Olympique Lyonnais.

Al-Nassr (2010–2011)
On 18 June 2010, Petre signed a one-year renewable contract with Al-Nassr of Saudi Arabia for $1,500,000. In his first match for Al-Nassr, Petre scored the winning goal in a 1–0 win over Najran.

Modena FC (2011–2012)
After the contract with Al-Nassr ended, Petre took an offer to join Italian Serie B side Modena. It was confirmed that he would sign a one-year contract on 26 July 2011.

International career
Petre earned 23 caps for Romania and scored one goal. He made his national debut on 17 April 2002 in a 2–1 win over Poland.

Personal life 
He is not related to Ciprian Petre. But he is married with Oana Nistor and they have Eva as a daughter.

Career statistics

International

International goals

Honours

ACS Poli Timișoara
Liga II: 2014–15

References

External links
 Ovidiu Petre  at FC Steaua București
 
 

1982 births
Living people
Footballers from Bucharest
Romanian footballers
Romania under-21 international footballers
FC Progresul București players
FC Politehnica Timișoara players
Galatasaray S.K. footballers
Modena F.C. players
Al Nassr FC players
FC Steaua București players
ACS Poli Timișoara players
Association football midfielders
Romanian expatriate footballers
Romania international footballers
Liga I players
Süper Lig players
Serie B players
Expatriate footballers in Turkey
Expatriate footballers in Saudi Arabia
Expatriate footballers in Italy
Romanian expatriate sportspeople in Saudi Arabia
Saudi Professional League players